The small niltava (Niltava macgrigoriae) is a species of bird in the family Muscicapidae, native to the Indian subcontinent and Southeast Asia.  It is found in Bangladesh, Bhutan, India, Laos, Myanmar, Nepal, Thailand, Tibet and Vietnam. Its natural habitat is subtropical or tropical moist montane forests.

Taxonomy and systematics

Subspecies 

 N. m. macgrogoriae - (Burton, 1836): The nominate subspecies, found in the central and western Himalayas from Uttarakhand to Sikkim and West Bengal.
 N. m. signata - (McClelland, 1840): Found in Northeast India, Myanmar, southern China, north Thailand, and continental Southeast Asia. Non-breeding individuals are also found in coastal Guangdong. Males tend to have a greyer belly and underside than the nominate.

Behaviour and ecology

Diet 
Eats small invertebrates and fruits.

Gallery

References

small niltava
Birds of Bhutan
Birds of Nepal
Birds of North India
Birds of Northeast India
Birds of South China
Birds of Yunnan
Birds of Southeast Asia
small niltava
Taxonomy articles created by Polbot